The George Box Medal is an insignia of an award named after the statistician George Box. It is awarded annually by the European Network for Business and Industrial Statistics (ENBIS) in recognition of outstanding work in the development and the application of statistical methods in European business and industry.

Past Recipients 
Source: ENBIS
2003 George Box
2004 Søren Bisgaard
2005 Sir David Cox
2006 Gerry Hahn
2007 Poul Thyregod
2008 Doug Montgomery
2009 Tony Greenfield
2010 David Stewardson
2011 Henry Philip Wynn
2012 Bill Woodall
2013 David Steinberg
2014 John F. MacGregor
2015 Geoffrey Vining
2016 David J. Hand
2017 C. F. Jeff Wu
2018 Ron S. Kenett
2019 Ronald J.M.M. Does
2020 William Q. Meeker
2021 Christine Anderson-Cook
2022 Jianjun Shi

See also

 List of mathematics awards

References

External links
 . ENBIS website.

Mathematics awards
Statistical awards